George Peter Colson (born 24 October 1993) is an English born Welsh footballer. Mainly a right back, he can also play as a midfielder.

Career

Portsmouth and loans
Colson signed a two-year scholarship with Portsmouth on 15 July 2010. On 26 June 2012, he signed a one-year professional deal.

On 14 August 2012, he made his debut in the League Cup in a 3–0 defeat at Plymouth Argyle.

On 21 November 2012, Colson joined Dorchester Town on an initial month-long loan, alongside Dan Thompson. He made his debut in a Dorset Senior Cup match against Wimborne Town a game which Colson scored in, the fixture ended 3–2 to Wimborne. Colson's league debut was in a 2–2 draw on 2 January against struggling Truro City. His last involvement for the Magpies was as an unused substitute in a 1–0 win over Dover Athletic.

On 23 January 2013 Colson joined Southern League Premier Division side Bashley on a month's loan joining up with fellow Portsmouth winger Elliot Wheeler. In March, he returned to Portsmouth, and after being told that his contract would not be renewed, Colson secured a trial at Stoke City. He then was released at the end of the season.

Bashley
Colson signed permanently for Bashley on 24 September 2013, after a good loan spell at the club. In January 2014 Colson Left the club

Fareham Town / Newport IW
According to their official website, Colson signed for Newport IW on 1 November 2014, after a short stint at Fareham Town.

Salisbury
On 27 July 2015, Colson joined Salisbury. On 31 May 2018, after being previously released, he re-joined the club. On 10 October 2019 it was confirmed that Calson had cancelled his Salisbury FC contract and registration by mutual consent.

Chiropractor 
George is a qualified McTimoney Chiropractor. George is practicing at Wootton Chiropractic Clinic, on the Isle of Wight.

International career
Colson has played for the Wales national under-16 football team.

References

External links
Aylesbury United profile

Portsmouth F.C. players
Dorchester Town F.C. players
Bashley F.C. players
Fareham Town F.C. players
Newport (IOW) F.C. players
Salisbury F.C. players
People from Cowes
Welsh footballers
Living people
Wales youth international footballers
Association football midfielders
1993 births